I Promise to Pay is a 1937 American drama film directed by D. Ross Lederman.

Cast
 Chester Morris as Eddie Lang
 Leo Carrillo as Richard Farra
 Helen Mack as Mary Lang
 Thomas Mitchell as District Attorney J.E. Curtis
 Thurston Hall as Police Captain Hall
 John Gallaudet as Al Morton - aka Johnson
 Patsy O'Connor as Judy Lang
 Wallis Clark as B.G. Wilson
 James Flavin as Bill Seaver
 Edward Keane as Mike Reardon
 Harry Woods as Henchman Fats
 Henry Brandon as Henchman Fancyface
 Marc Lawrence as Henchman Whitehat

References

External links
 

1937 films
1937 drama films
American drama films
American black-and-white films
1930s English-language films
Films directed by D. Ross Lederman
Columbia Pictures films
1930s American films
English-language drama films